Sangay (also known as Macas, Sanagay, or Sangai) is an active stratovolcano in central Ecuador. It exhibits mostly strombolian activity. Geologically, Sangay marks the southern boundary of the Northern Volcanic Zone, and its position straddling two major pieces of crust accounts for its high level of activity. Sangay's approximately 500,000-year-old history is one of instability; two previous versions of the mountain were destroyed in massive flank collapses, evidence of which still litters its surroundings today.

Due to its remoteness, Sangay hosts a significant biological community with fauna such as the mountain tapir, giant otter, Andean cock-of-the-rock and king vulture. Since 1983, its ecological community has been protected as part of the Sangay National Park. Although climbing the mountain is hampered by its remoteness, poor weather conditions, river flooding, and the danger of falling ejecta, the volcano is regularly climbed, a feat first achieved by Robert T. Moore in 1929.

Geological setting

Lying at the eastern edge of the Andean cordillera, Sangay was formed by volcanic processes associated with the subduction of the Nazca Plate under the South American Plate at the Peru–Chile Trench.  It is the southernmost volcano in the Northern Volcanic Zone, a subgroup of Andean volcanoes whose northern limit is Nevado del Ruiz in Colombia.

The next active volcano in the chain, Sabancaya, is in Peru,  to the south. Sangay is above a seismogenic tectonic slab about  beneath Sabancaya, reflecting a sharp difference in the thermal character of the subducted oceanic crust, between older rock beneath southern Ecuador and Peru (dated more than 32 million years old), and younger rock under northern Ecuador and Colombia (dated less than 22 million years old). The older southern rock is more thermally stable than the northern rock, and to this is attributed the long break in volcanic activity in the Andes; Sangay occupies a position at the boundary between these two bodies, accounting for its high level of activity.

Legend 
Many say that gold lies under Sangay.

Geology
Sangay developed in three distinct phases. The curved shape of the remnants of this first structure shows that it suffered a massive flank collapse, scattering the nearby forest lowlands with debris and causing a large part of its southern caldera wall to slide off the mountain, forming an embayment lower on its slopes. Acidic andesites with just under 60% silicon dioxide dominate these flows, but more basic andesites can be found as well.

Sangay's second edifice began to form anew after the massive sector collapse that damaged the first, being constructed between 100,000 and 50,000 years ago. Remnants of its second structure are within the southern and eastern parts of the debris from its first collapse; some remnants of the volcano lie to the west and north as well. It was likely less voluminous than the volcano's first version, and its summit lay near Sangay's current summit.

It has a west-east trending summit ridge, capped by three active craters and a lava dome. Sangay has been active in its current form for at least 14,000 years, and is still filling out the area left bare by its earlier incarnations, being smaller than either of them. Uniquely, in its 500,000 years of activity, its magma plume has never changed composition or moved a significant distance.

Mainly andesitic in composition, Sangay is highly active. The volcano erupted again in 1728, remaining essentially continuously active through 1916, with particularly heavy activity in 1738–1744, 1842–1843, 1849, 1854–1859, 1867–1874, 1872, and 1903. After a brief pause, it erupted again on August 8, 1934, and has not completely quelled ever since, with heavy eruptive periods occurring in 1934–1937 and 1941–1942.

Eruptions at Sangay exhibit strombolian activity, producing ashfall, lava flows, pyroclastic flows, and lahars. All known eruptions at the volcano have had a Volcanic Explosivity Index (VEI) of 3. Despite its activity, Sangay is located in a remote, uninhabited region; only a large Plinian eruption could threaten occupied areas  to its west. Nonetheless, a flank collapse on its eastern side, possible given the volcano's construction and history, could displace nearby forest and possibly affect settlements. Access to the volcano is difficult, as its current eruptive state constantly peppers the massif with molten rock and other ejecta. For these reasons it is not nearly as well-studied as other, similarly active volcanoes in the Andes and elsewhere; the first detailed study of the volcano was not published until 1999.

Ecology

Sangay is one of two active volcanoes in the Sangay National Park, the other being Tungurahua to the north. As such it has been listed as a UNESCO World Heritage Site since 1983. The area's isolation has allowed it to maintain a pristine ecology relatively untouched by human interaction, and the park hosts a biome ranging from alpine glaciers on the volcanoes' peaks to tropical forest on their flanks. Altitude and rainfall are the most significant local factors affecting fauna, and therefore the lushest ecosystems are found on the wetter parts of the volcano's eastern slope.

The highest level below the snowline is dominated by lichen and bryophytes. Below this lies a zone of small trees and shrubs which develops into montane forest, principally in western valleys and on well-irrigated eastern slopes, which occurs below .

Fauna is similarly distributed, with distinct altitudinal zonation present. The highest altitudes support the endangered mountain tapir, cougar, guinea pig, and Andean fox. Lower down, the spectacled bear, jaguar, ocelot, margay, white-tailed deer, brocket deers, northern pudú, and endangered giant otter can all be found. Bird species common in the area include the Andean condor, Andean cock-of-the-rock, giant hummingbird, torrent duck, king vulture, and swallow-tailed kite.

Recreation
Sangay can and has been climbed. It was first ascended in 1929 by Robert T. Moore, prior to its current eruption beginning in 1934. However, the volcano's current active state presents dangers to mountaineers in the form of falling ejecta; in 1976, two members of an expedition on the volcano were struck and killed by falling debris. In addition, the volcano is located in a remote region with poor roads and is difficult to access, and periods of heavy rainfall can flood rivers and cause landslides, rendering the mountain routes impassable. Nonetheless, the Instituto Ecuatoriano Forestal y de Areas Naturales, which maintains an office near the mountain, facilitate such activities by providing local guides and rooms for rent to visitors. Ascension takes between 7 and 10 days from Quito. Conditions on the volcano are usually very wet and foggy, which may impair visibility significantly during the ascent.

Recent Activity

Sangay has erupted at least eleven times during the Holocene epoch. Its most recent eruption began on 26 March 2019, and it has remained in continuing eruption status (intermittent eruptive events without a break of 3 months or more) as of 15 October 2021.

On 15 June 2022, the National Weather Service issued an ashfall advisory as the volcano went into a state of unrest, producing a plume of volcanic ash. Mariners traveling in the vicinity were cautioned about the possibility of debris.

See also

Lists of volcanoes
List of volcanoes in Ecuador

References

External links
 National Geographic: Collecting Clues to Solve a Volcanic Mystery
 
 Sangay Volcano Erupts, Turns Day to Night in Ecuador - Sept. 20, 2020

Stratovolcanoes of Ecuador
Active volcanoes
Andean Volcanic Belt
Holocene stratovolcanoes
Quaternary South America
Five-thousanders of the Andes